Kapiri Mposhi District is a district of Zambia, located in Central Province. The capital lies at Kapiri Mposhi. As of the 2010 Zambian Census, the district had a population of 240,638 people.

Geography
The district borders with Copperbelt Province and with the districts of Chibombo, Chisamba, Kabwe, Luano, Masaiti, Mkushi, Mpongwe and Ngabwe.

Municipalities
It is composed by 14 municipalities:

See also
Kapiri Mposhi (Zambian National Assembly constituency)

References

Districts of Central Province, Zambia